Frank Tønnesen (born 3 January 1973) is a retired Norwegian football defender.

He spent most of his career at IK Start, from 1993 through 1999. After one season in FK Vigør he moved west to Mandalskameratene, before rounding off his career in his hometown with Fløy.

References

1973 births
Living people
Sportspeople from Kristiansand
Norwegian footballers
IK Start players
FK Vigør players
Mandalskameratene players
Flekkerøy IL players
Norwegian First Division players
Eliteserien players
Association football defenders
Norway under-21 international footballers